Ashes to Answers is an outdoor 2013 sculpture by Austin Weishel, installed at Fifth and F streets NW in Washington, D.C., in the United States. The work serves as a monument to arson dogs.

See also

 2013 in art

References

2013 establishments in Washington, D.C.
2013 sculptures
Animal sculptures in Washington, D.C.
Dog monuments
Sculptures of dogs in the United States
Monuments and memorials in Washington, D.C.
Outdoor sculptures in Washington, D.C.
Sculptures of men in Washington, D.C.
Statues in Washington, D.C.
Judiciary Square